Xanthiosite is an arsenate mineral first discovered in Germany in 1858; it may also be found in Greece.  It is not radioactive.

References

Arsenate minerals
Nickel minerals
Monoclinic minerals
Minerals in space group 14